La Peste is the second studio album by Alabama 3, released in 2000.

The album peaked at No. 80 on the UK Albums Chart.

Critical reception
Record Collector called the album "a dreamy romp through cinematic mini-masterpieces including 'Sad Eyed Lady Of The Low Life', 'Mansion On The Hill' and 'The Thrills Are Gone'." Trouser Press called it "a disappointing disgrace of an album," writing "the new, gussied-up A3 (designed, perhaps, not to offend Sopranos fans) is merely overproduced and out of ideas." NME deemed it "deeply pointless, if hilarious" and an "almost monumental waste of time." The Independent judged it "infectiously intelligent," writing that the band still operates "fruitfully at the convergence of country, funk, gospel and drug culture."

Track listing
 "Too Sick to Pray" (Love, Love, Love, Empiricist) - 4:44
 "Mansion on the Hill" (Love, Love, Love, Dope) - 3:00
 "Sad Eyed Lady of the Lowlife" (Love, Love, Love, Love, The Spirit) - 4:43
 "Walking in My Sleep" (Love, Love, Love, Love, Empiricist, The Spirit) - 6:09
 "Wade into the Water" (Love, Love, Empiricist) - 5:15
 "Hotel California" (Don Felder, Don Henley, Glenn Frey) - 5:34
 "Cocaine (Killed My Community)" (Love, Love, Love, Dope) - 4:44
 "The Thrills Have Gone" (Love, Empiricist, The Spirit, Paddy Hill) - 4:30
 "2129" (Love, Love, Empiricist, Dope) - 4:24
 "Strange" (Love, Love, Empiricist, The Spirit) - 5:27
 "Sinking..." (Love, Love, Love, The Spirit) - 5:29
Bonus track (limited UK release)
 "Woke Up This Morning" (Chosen One mix) (Love, Love, Love, The Very Reverend Dr. D. Love) - 4:09

Personnel 
Alabama 3
Larry Love (Rob Spragg) - lead vocals
D Wayne Love (Jake Black) - vocals
The Mountain of Love (Piers Marsh) - programming, harmonica, synthesiser
Sir "Real" Love L.S.D.O.P.T. (Simon Edwards) - percussion
Captain Empiricist (Mark Sams) - guitar
L.B. Dope (Johnny Delafons) - drums
The Spirit (Orlando Harrison) - keyboards
John "Segs" Jennings - guitars, bass, backing vocals
with:
Steve "Dub" Jones - additional programming, synthesizers
Val Harrison - vocals on 2, 9, 10, 11
Paddy Hill and Treat - vocals on "The Thrills Have Gone"
The Street Angels Choir 2000 - backing vocals
Steve Roberts - backing vocals on "Sad Eyed Lady of the Low Life", "Strange" and "Sinking..."
Jenna Spencer - backing vocals on "Walking in My Sleep" and "Sinking..."
Eileen Rose - vocals on "Wade Into the Water"
Bobby Valentino - mandolin on "Wade Into the Water"
Ben Chapman - DJ cuts on "Sad Eyed Lady of the Low Life", "Hotel California" and "Cocaine (Killed My Community)"
Bernie Clarke - organ on "Hotel California", horn arrangement on "Sinking..."
Ned Morant - triangle on "Hotel California"
Lushlife - horns on "Sinking..."
Delrig, JC, Ray Mascarenas - backing vocals on "Sinking..."
Simon Limbrick - steel drums on "Sinking..."
Mr. Shifta - vocals on "Woke Up This Morning"
Technical
John Collyer, Steve "Dub" Jones - engineer
Nigel Bennett - photography

References

2000 albums
Alabama 3 albums
Geffen Records albums
One Little Independent Records albums